Ryan Menei (born July 31, 1986) is a former Canadian professional ice hockey player. He last played for the Tulsa Oilers in the Central Hockey League. He previously played with SG Cortina in the Italian Serie A and after one season with the Tulsa Oilers, Menei initially agreed to a one-year contract with the Sheffield Steelers in the EIHL on June 21, 2013. However a month out from the 2013–14 season, Menei had a change of mind and opted out of his contract to continue for a second season with the Tulsa Oilers. 2020 fantasy football champion*.

Career statistics

Awards and honours
CHL All-Star Game Most Valuable Player (Rapid City) (2010–11)

References

External links

1986 births
Living people
Asiago Hockey 1935 players
Bakersfield Condors (1998–2015) players
Canadian ice hockey right wingers
Johnstown Chiefs players
Mississippi Sea Wolves players
Moose Jaw Warriors players
Muskegon Fury players
Rapid City Rush players
Saskatoon Blades players
SG Cortina players
Ice hockey people from Winnipeg
Tulsa Oilers (1992–present) players
Canadian expatriate ice hockey players in Italy
Canadian expatriate ice hockey players in the United States